Lasioglossum nitidiusculum  is a Palearctic species of sweat bee.

References

External links
Images representing  Lasioglossum nitidiusculum 

Hymenoptera of Europe
nitidiusculum
Insects described in 1802